Pre-algebra is a common name for a course in middle school mathematics in the United States, usually taught in the 7th grade or 8th grade. The objective of it is to prepare students for the study of algebra. Usually algebra is taught in the 8th and 9th grade.

As an intermediate stage after arithmetic, pre-algebra helps students pass certain conceptual barriers. Students are introduced to the idea that an equals sign, rather than just being the answer to a question as in basic arithmetic, means that two sides are equivalent, and can be manipulated together. They also learn how numbers, variables, and words can be used in the same ways.

Subjects 
Subjects taught in a pre-algebra course may include:
 Review of natural number arithmetic
 Types of numbers such as integers, fractions, decimals and negative numbers
 Ratios and percents
 Factorization of natural numbers
 Properties of operations such as associativity and distributivity
 Simple (integer) roots and powers
 Rules of evaluation of expressions, such as operator precedence and use of parentheses
 Basics of equations, including rules for invariant manipulation of equations
 Understanding of variable manipulation
 Manipulation and plotting in the standard 4-quadrant Cartesian coordinate plane
 Powers in scientific notation (example: 34 × 107 in scientific notation is 3.4 × 108)
 Identifying Probability
 Solving Square roots 
 Pythagorean Theorem

Pre-algebra may include subjects from geometry, especially to further the understanding of algebra in applications to area and volume.

Pre-Algebra may also include subjects from statistics to identify probability and interpret data.

Proficiency in pre-algebra has been shown to be an indicator of college success. It can also be taught as a remedial course for college students.

References

Elementary mathematics
Algebra education